Secret (Korean: 시크릿) (Subtitle: Are You a Good Person?) was a game-talk show featuring secrets of celebrities. Originally airing after Immortal Songs 2, the program faced difficulty when Immortal Songs 2 aired for too long, thus eating into the airtime of Secret. On one occasion, the program only aired for three minutes on July 23, 2011.

Format 
Stars must play games and succeed to prevent a secret of theirs from being revealed by a friend.

Hosts 

 Lee Hwi-jae
 Shin Bong-sun
 Kim Hee-chul (Episode 1-14)
 Boom (Episode 17-23)

List of episodes

Ratings 
In the tables below, the  represent the lowest ratings and the  represent the highest ratings.

References 

Korean Broadcasting System original programming
South Korean variety television shows
Korean-language television shows
2011 South Korean television series debuts
2011 South Korean television series endings